Anne Terpstra (born 5 January 1991 in Zierikzee) is a Dutch cross-country cyclist. She placed 15th in the women's cross-country race at the 2016 Summer Olympics. She was on the start list of 2018 Cross-Country European Championships and was not allowed to finish.

In 2019, during the Mountain Bike World Cup in Andorra, she won her first World Cup by beating Jolanda Neff in the final lap. Terpstra is the first Dutch female athlete to win a World Cup. During the 2019 UCI World Cup finals In Snowshoe, USA, she became 2nd and secured a 4th in the overall.

In September 2019 she was leading the UCI World ranking for the first time.

She has no relation to fellow Dutch cyclist, Niki Terpstra.

Major results

2020
 1st  Cross-country, National Championships
 2nd  Cross-country, UEC European Championships
 2nd Overall UCI XCO World Cup
2nd Nové Město I
2nd Nové Město II
2021
 2nd  Cross-country, UCI World Championships
 2nd  Cross-country, UEC European Championships
2022
 1st  Cross-country, National Championships
 UCI XCO World Cup
1st Vallnord
2nd Petrópolis
3rd Snowshoe
 UCI XCC World Cup
2nd Leogang
2nd Vallnord
2nd Snowshoe
 3rd  Cross-country, UEC European Championships

References

1991 births
Living people
Dutch female cyclists
Olympic cyclists of the Netherlands
Cyclists at the 2016 Summer Olympics
Sportspeople from Zierikzee
Cyclists at the 2020 Summer Olympics
Cyclists from Zeeland
21st-century Dutch women